Hemoglobin subunit theta-1 is a protein that in humans is encoded by the HBQ1 gene.

Theta-globin mRNA is found in human fetal erythroid tissue but not in adult erythroid or other nonerythroid tissue. The theta-1 gene may be expressed very early in embryonic life, perhaps sometime before 5 weeks. Theta-1 is a member of the human alpha-globin gene cluster that involves five functional genes and two pseudogenes. The order of genes is: 5' - zeta - pseudozeta - mu - pseudoalpha-1 - alpha-2 - alpha-1 - theta-1 - 3'. Research supports a transcriptionally active role for the gene and a functional role for the peptide in specific cells, possibly those of early erythroid tissue.

References

Further reading

Hemoglobins